Amy James-Kelly (born 15 November 1995) is a Northern Irish actress. She gained prominence through her role as Maddie Heath in the ITV soap opera Coronation Street (2013–2015). She has since starred in the Netflix series Safe (2018) and the BBC One drama Three Families (2021).

Early life
James-Kelly was born in Antrim, Northern Ireland and moved to England as a baby. She spent the first year of her life in Catterick, North Yorkshire before settling down in Failsworth, Greater Manchester. She attended The Blue Coat School, Oldham. She took extra-curricular classes at the Manchester School of Acting.

Career 
James-Kelly began her career in theatre productions of Beauty Manifesto, Trojan Women, My Fair Lady and Frank and Ferdinand.

In December 2013, James-Kelly made her television debut in the ITV soap opera Coronation Street as Maddie Heath, a troubled teenager and Sophie Webster's love interest. James-Kelly found out she had been cast on the bus home from college. In February 2015, she announced she would be leaving Coronation Street and made her final appearance that June when her character was killed off.

On leaving, James-Kelly said, "I made the decision to leave because I'm young and adventurous, and I want to gain more experience and explore and improve my craft. Acting is my passion and I'm excited to see where it takes me." She landed her second television role as Martha Quaintain in the 2016 period drama miniseries Jericho.

James-Kelly starred as Jenny Delaney in the 2018 Netflix series Safe. She also had a guest role in the BBC One series Moving On.

James-Kelly made her feature film debut as Sarah in the 2019 comedy-drama Military Wives. That same year, she had a recurring role as Suzannah Washington in the BBC One and HBO series Gentleman Jack.

In 2021, James-Kelly appeared as Grace Marshbrook in series 2 of the ITV crime drama The Bay and starred as Hannah Kennedy in the two-part BBC One drama Three Families. She has a role in the Channel 4 sitcom Everyone Else Burns.

Filmography

Film

Television

References

External links

Living people
1995 births
21st-century actresses from Northern Ireland
21st-century English actresses
Actresses from Oldham
Actresses from Yorkshire
People from Catterick, North Yorkshire
People from Failsworth
People from Antrim, County Antrim
Soap opera actresses from Northern Ireland
Stage actresses from Northern Ireland
Television actresses from Northern Ireland
English soap opera actresses
English television actresses
English stage actresses